Vivek Shauq (21 June 1963  – 10 January 2011) was an Indian actor, comedian, writer and singer. He had acted in Hindi and Punjabi films, television serials, theatre and television commercials. He was also a popular writer and singer. Shauq was also involved with the Sant Nirankari Mission. He was fluent in Urdu. He was also the founding member of the Nonsense Club. He died of a heart attack on 10 January 2011 in Mumbai, at the age of 47. He was survived by his wife and three children.

Early life
Shauq was born on 21 June 1963 in Chandigarh. His father died in 1980 and his mother in the late 80s. He did his study from Indo-Swiss Training Centre (ISTC).

Career
Shauq started his acting career in theatre and television. He starred in Ulta Pulta and Flop Show on Doordarshan, alongside Jaspal Bhatti. He then shifted his focus to Punjabi films and Hindi films. His first Hindi film was Barsaat Ki Raat in 1998. He was noticed in Gadar: Ek Prem Katha. His prominent films included Delhi Heights, Aitraaz, 36 China Town, Hum Ko Deewana Kar Gaye, Asa Nu Maan Watna Da, Dil Hai Tumhaara, Mini Punjab and Nalaik. He had worked with and was greatly influenced by Jaspal Bhatti, who considered him his right-hand man.

Death
He had a heart attack on 3 January 2011 and was admitted to Jupiter Hospital in Thane. He was on life support, but slipped into a coma and could not be revived. On Monday, 10 January 2011, Shauq died from sepsis at 5:00 AM. His funeral was held on Tuesday, 11 January 2011 at 4pm at Sant Nirankari Mission.

Filmography

TV serials
 Ulta Pulta directed by Jaspal Bhatti
 Flop Show directed by Jaspal Bhatti
 Full Tension directed by Jaspal Bhatti
 Afsane directed by Lalit Behl

See also
List of Indian Punjabi films

References

External links
 Vivek Shauq Information
 

1963 births
2011 deaths
Male actors in Hindi cinema
Indian male television actors
Indian male comedians
Male actors from Mumbai
Indian satirists
Male actors from Chandigarh
Punjabi people
Male actors in Punjabi cinema
20th-century Indian male actors